Emanuele Maurizii (born 2 February 2001) is an Italian professional footballer who plays as a left back for  club Pro Sesto.

Club career 
Born in Sant'Omero, Maurizii was formed in Ascoli youth sector. In 2020, he was promoted to the first team.

For the 2020–21 he was loaned to Serie C club Matelica. He played 12 league matches.

On 27 July 2021, he joined Ancona-Matelica on loan.

On 25 July 2022, Maurizii signed with Pro Sesto.

References

External links
 
 
 

2001 births
Living people
Sportspeople from the Province of Teramo
Footballers from Abruzzo
Italian footballers
Association football fullbacks
Serie C players
Ascoli Calcio 1898 F.C. players
S.S. Matelica Calcio 1921 players
Ancona-Matelica players
S.S.D. Pro Sesto players